Mayar is a mountain in the Grampians, in Angus, Scotland. It is usually climbed together with its near neighbour, Driesh. At an elevation of 928m, it is the 564th highest peak in the British Isles and the 253rd tallest in Scotland.

References

Munros
Mountains and hills of the Eastern Highlands
Mountains and hills of Angus, Scotland